Little Bird is a 1997 Spanish drama film written and directed by Carlos Saura which stars Paco Rabal, Alejandro Martínez, and Dafne Fernández.

Plot 
The plot follows Manuel "Manu", a 10-old-year boy from Madrid arriving in the province of Murcia for a Summer stay under his uncles so he can distance from the separation of his parents. There he experiences puppy love with cousin Fuensanta.

Cast

Production 
The film is a Filmart production.

Release 
The film was presented in August 1997 at the 21st Montreal World Film Festival, where Saura won the Best Director award. It was released theatrically in April 1998.

Reception 
Leonard Klady of Variety wrote that the "story is undeniably genial and well observed, but lacks a central focus or a compelling dramatic tension".

 observed that despite being "a film with irregularities in its narrative development", Little Bird is still "a mature, serene movie, where the director reviews old themes with a more tender gaze".

See also 
 List of Spanish films of 1998

References 

Spanish coming-of-age drama films
1990s Spanish films
1990s Spanish-language films
Films set in the Region of Murcia
Films shot in the Region of Murcia
Films directed by Carlos Saura